Gillingham and Rainham is a constituency in Kent represented in the House of Commons of the UK Parliament since its 2010 creation by Rehman Chishti, a Conservative. It replaced the previous constituency of Gillingham.

Boundaries

The Medway wards of Gillingham North, Gillingham South, Hempstead and Wigmore, Rainham Central, Rainham North, Rainham South, Twydall and Watling.

Constituency profile
The constituency is generally suburban and centred on Gillingham, historically a small port, which is within the London Commuter Belt. Local retail, industry, business parks, trades and professions provide constituents with a high level of employment, mostly on moderate to middle incomes; however, the area is not wholly resilient to unemployment. Registered claimants who were registered jobseekers were marginally lower than the national average of 3.8% at 3.5% of the population, according to a statistical compilation by The Guardian.

Residents' wealth is around average for the UK, but below average for the South East region.
The predecessor constituency of Gillingham was a Labour-Conservative marginal seat, but the current constituency can be considered a safe Conservative seat.

Members of Parliament

Elections

Elections in the 2010s

Paul Clark was the incumbent MP for Gillingham.

See also
 List of parliamentary constituencies in Kent

Notes

References

Politics of Medway
Parliamentary constituencies in Kent
Constituencies of the Parliament of the United Kingdom established in 2010
Gillingham, Kent